"Higher Love" is a 1986 song by Steve Winwood, covered by Whitney Houston in 1990, the later version being remade in 2019 by Kygo. 

It may also refer to:

"Higher Love", Alex Vargas song from his 2017 album Cohere
"Higher Love", Depeche Mode song from their 1993 album Songs of Faith and Devotion
Higher Love, original title At Sachem Farm, also known as 'Uncorked' and 'Trade Winds', a film
"Higher Love", title of episode 6 of eason 2 of the series BoJack Horseman